The Balearic Islands autonomous football team is the regional football team for the Balearic Islands, Spain. They are not affiliated with FIFA or UEFA, because it is represented internationally by the Spain national football team. It only plays friendly matches.

History
The team only played one game, against Malta at Palma de Mallorca, and they were defeated by 0–2.

For December 2008 was dated another game, this time against Equatorial Guinea, but it finally was cancelled. However, the women's team could make their debut, with a 1–7 loss to Galicia in Pontevedra.

On 13 November 2018, the Balearic Islands football team played a friendly match against Mallorca in benefit for the victims of the floods at Sant Llorenç des Cardassar. The match ended with a 4–1 win for Mallorca.

Matches

Notable players 
Balearic players who represented FIFA international teams

See also
:Category:Footballers from the Balearic Islands

References

Autonomous football team
Balearic Islands